Jorge Anthony Sanchez (born May 20, 1988) is an American former Major League Baseball (MLB) catcher who played for the Pittsburgh Pirates and Atlanta Braves between 2013 and 2017.

Early career

High school
A native of Miami, Florida, Sanchez was a three-time All-Dade County selection at Miami Killian Senior High School. He was team captain in 2005 and 2006, and led his team in every offensive category in 2006. Killian advanced to the Florida state finals in 2004 and 2005.

College
Sanchez has established himself as one of the most prolific hitters in Boston College Eagles baseball history. He ranks fifth all-time in home runs with 24 and runs batted in (RBI) with 124, sixth in hits with 202 and eighth in runs with 125.

In 2008, he played collegiate summer baseball in the Cape Cod Baseball League for the Yarmouth-Dennis Red Sox and was named a league all-star.

In 2009, Sanchez ranked eighth in the Atlantic Coast Conference (ACC) in runs (63), ninth in home runs (14), tenth in doubles (19) and slugging percentage (.614), twelfth in total bases (140), 16th in batting (.346) and 17th in hits (79) and on-base percentage (.443). He has also thrown out the most runners in the conference this season, catching opponents stealing 19 times. His 63 runs this season are a Boston College single-season record breaking the previous record of 60 runs held by Steve Langone and Sean McGowan which has held since 1999. His 14 home runs are the third-most in a single season and his 79 hits are fourth.

Sanchez is one of three finalists for the 2009 Johnny Bench Award, presented to the nation's top collegiate catcher as well as being named to the 2009 Louisville Slugger All-America Third Team and tabbed as one of 30 semifinalists for the Golden Spikes Award, presented to the nation's premier amateur baseball player. He was also the first player from Boston College to be voted to the All-ACC First Team. He also played for the Battle Creek Bombers of the Northwoods League.

Professional career

Pittsburgh Pirates

Sanchez was selected 4th overall in the 2009 MLB draft by the Pittsburgh Pirates, and became just the third catcher out of Boston College to be selected in the MLB Draft, and also the highest draft pick in Boston College history.

Sanchez made his professional debut for the Short-Season A State College Spikes on June 20, 2009. He played in four games for the Spikes before being promoted to the Single-A West Virginia Power. Sanchez finished the 2009 season with the Advanced-A Lynchburg Hillcats, and in 48 combined games that year, hit .309 with 7 home runs and 48 RBI. He played the entire 2010 season with the Bradenton Marauders, catching the inaugural game with the Pirates new Advanced-A affiliate. In 59 games, Sanchez batted .314 with 4 home runs and 35 RBI. In the offseason he played in 18 games for the Mesa Solar Sox of the Arizona Fall League (AFL), batting .206 with 4 home runs and 9 RBI.

Continuing his progression through the minor leagues, Sanchez played the 2011 season with the Double-A Altoona Curve. In a career-high 118 games, he hit .241 with 5 home runs and 44 RBI. Sanchez split time in the 2012 season with Altoona and the Triple-A Indianapolis Indians. He would bat .251 with 8 home runs and 43 RBI in 102 combined games. In November 2012, the Pirates added Sanchez to the 40 man roster to protect him from the Rule 5 draft.

On June 21, 2013, Sanchez was officially recalled to the Pittsburgh Pirates. He recorded his first Major League hit on June 23, 2013 – a double off of the Angels right hander Joe Blanton. The ball that Sanchez hit got stuck in the scoreboard, and after the Pirates finished batting, officials went out and retrieved the ball. He would appear in 22 games with the Pirates in 2013, hitting .233 with 2 home runs and 5 RBI. In the minor leagues that year, Sanchez hit .282 with 10 home runs and 42 RBI. 2014 again saw Sanchez split time between the Major and minor leagues. He would play in 26 games for the Pirates, and bat .267 with 2 home runs and 13 RBI. In Triple-A Indianapolis, Sanchez batted .235 with 11 home runs and 45 RBI. During the offseason, he appeared in 10 games for the Toros del Este of the Dominican Winter League.

Sanchez played the majority of the 2015 season in Indianapolis, hitting .236 with 3 home runs and 47 RBI in 94 games. He played just 3 MLB games for the Pirates in 2015, batting .375. On January 6, 2016, Sanchez was designated for assignment. He was released on January 13.

Toronto Blue Jays
On February 19, 2016, Sanchez signed a minor league contract with the Toronto Blue Jays that included an invitation to spring training. He was released on July 28.

San Francisco Giants
Sanchez signed a minor league contract with the San Francisco Giants on August 3, 2016. Sanchez was promoted to the major league on September 27, 2016.

Los Angeles Angels of Anaheim
On December 2, 2016, Sanchez signed a minor league contract with the Los Angeles Angels of Anaheim.

Atlanta Braves
On August 31, 2017, Sanchez was traded to the Braves for Brandon Phillips He became a free agent on October 24, 2017.

Cincinnati Reds
On February 25, 2018, Sanchez signed a minor league deal with the Cincinnati Reds.

Texas Rangers
On April 16, 2018, Sanchez was traded to the Texas Rangers for a player to be named later or cash. He elected free agency on November 2, 2018. Sanchez re-signed on a minor-league deal on January 22, 2019. He was assigned to AA Frisco RoughRiders for the 2019 season, hitting .246/.316/.346 with 4 home runs and 31 RBI. He became a free agent following the 2019 season.

References

External links

BC Eagles Player Bio

1988 births
Living people
Baseball players from Miami
Major League Baseball catchers
Pittsburgh Pirates players
Atlanta Braves players
Boston College Eagles baseball players
Yarmouth–Dennis Red Sox players
Bradenton Marauders players
State College Spikes players
West Virginia Power players
Lynchburg Hillcats players
Altoona Curve players
Mesa Solar Sox players
Indianapolis Indians players
Buffalo Bisons (minor league) players
Sacramento River Cats players
Salt Lake Bees players
Louisville Bats players
Round Rock Express players
Frisco RoughRiders players
Miami Killian Senior High School alumni